Mai Hero Boll Raha Hu is an Indian Hindi-language gangster-thriller web series streaming on the ZEE5 and ALTBalaji platform. It stars Parth Samthaan in the lead role of a gangster along with Patralekha Paul who plays an aspiring actress. The narrative is set in the 80's-90's era of the Mumbai underworld and chronicles the journey and rise of Parth Samthaan's character Nawab aka Hero. The web series was released on 20 April 2021.

Plot 
The story is about a 17-year-old boy Nawab (Parth Samthaan) who is forced to flee Bareilly, he soon turns into Bombay's most powerful don. Nawab’s most significant mentor is Lala (Arsalan Goni) who introduces him to the world of gun bazaars, counterfeit DVD rackets, smuggling, extortion, killings and shootouts. Nawab falls in love with Laila (Patralekhaa) an upcoming actress who isn't aware of his true identity.

Cast 

 Parth Samthaan as Nawab aka Hero
 Patralekha Paul as Laila
 Arslan Goni as Lala
Anubhav Nanda as Yakub
Upen Chauhan as Mushtaq
Danish Husain as DadaBhai
Chandan Roy Sanyal as Mastaan
Arshin Mehta as Manasvi
Ankit Gupta as Inspector Sachin Kadam
Indraneel Bhattacharya as Bakshi
Pankaj Avadhesh Shukla as Baagha
Tarun Chaturvedi as Mach Mach
Saaquib Ayubi as Yeda
Rohan Verma as Saavla
Ganesh Yadav

Episodes

Reception

Critical Reception 
The Times of India gave a 2.5/5 rating and critically reviewed the OTT crime drama by stating that there is nothing new as the story is quite similar to the usual Bollywood gangster drama. The series is about a gangster who wants to rule Mumbai, exploit his Bollywood connection and is trapped in a love triangle alongside an inevitable gang war. ‘Mai Hero Boll Raha Hu’ is a good choice for someone who likes the gangster genre.

The Indian Express gave a review by calling the Parth Samthaan-starrer series "Filmy". Though it had a similar plot to any Bollywood gangster movies where a gangster rises from the dirt to rule the city. The narrative is pacy and dialogues sound a bit familiar but it only adds to the story and the characters. The young actor Parth Samthaan did a great job with his versatile acting skills and played the role of a gangster very well.

Binged gave a 5/10 rating to the ZEE5 web series stating that it is "A Watchable Old-Fashioned Gangster Saga". The screenplay is crisp and has enough twists to make up for the weak storyline. Fast-paced screenplay, old-fashioned dialogue baazi and Parth Samthaan's refreshing performances are some of the highlights of the series.

References

External links 
 
Mai Hero Boll Raha Hu at ZEE5
Mai Hero Boll Raha Hu at ALTBalaji

Hindi-language web series